Tom Cheney (born 1954) is an American cartoonist. He was born in Norfolk, Virginia and grew up in Saranac Lake, NY, and later in Watertown, New York. He attended Watertown High School (class of '72), and graduated from the State University of New York at Potsdam in 1976 with a BA in psychology. A contributing artist to The New Yorker for 42 years, his work has also appeared in over 500 other publications in the United States and other countries, including Esquire, National Lampoon, The Harvard Business Review, Mad Magazine, Penthouse, The Wall Street Journal, Punch, Barron's Magazine, Hustler Magazine, and the "Commies From Mars" comic book series. Tom was the 1985 winner of the Charles M. Schulz Outstanding Cartoonist Award for his work in magazine cartooning, and his cartoons have been spotlighted on ABC Nightline, CNN, CBS 60 Minutes, and NBC News. Originals of his work are on permanent display at the Museum of Cartoon Art, the New-York Historical Society, the headquarters of the United Nations, and the Empire State Building, as well as in numerous private collections. He and his wife Cynthia live in Hawaii.

References

The New Yorker Encyclopedia of Cartoons
The New Yorker Magazine
Mad Magazine

External links
Complete list of Cheney's work for MAD Magazine
Tom Cheney at the Cartoon Bank
 http://www.nobleworksinc.com/nsearch.html?vwcatalog=yhst-130756708828791&query=tom+cheney&x=0&y=0
https://www.instagram.com/tomcheney54/

American comics writers
The New Yorker cartoonists
1954 births
Artists from Norfolk, Virginia
Living people
The Magazine of Fantasy & Science Fiction people